Elliott Ormsbee (September 19, 1921 – December 12, 2010) was an American football halfback. He played for the Philadelphia Eagles in 1946.

He died on December 12, 2010, in Hot Springs, Arkansas at age 89.

References

1921 births
2010 deaths
American football halfbacks
Bradley Braves football players
Philadelphia Eagles players
United States Navy personnel of World War II
People from Hamilton, Illinois